Ervin Hallunaj (born 14 April 1990) is a former Albanian football player who played as a goalkeeper.

References

1990 births
Living people
Footballers from Shkodër
Albanian footballers
Association football goalkeepers
KS Burreli players
KF Vllaznia Shkodër players
KS Ada Velipojë players
KS Veleçiku Koplik players
KF Butrinti players
Kategoria Superiore players
Kategoria e Parë players